You the Jury is an American reality prime time court show which aired on Fox as a live program, where high-profile civil cases were re-enacted with lawyers known for working on high-profile cases, along with a live audience and viewer voting about their opinion of whether they agree or disagree with the defendant (although any decision made by the show had no legal effect). Premiering on April 7, 2017, the series was hosted by former New York State jurist and current Fox News Channel host Jeanine Pirro.

The series was canceled after two episodes had aired.

Cast
 Jeanine Pirro - Host
 LaDoris Cordell -  Judge

The show intended to cycle through six attorneys known for working on high-profile cases. Only three appeared defending or prosecuting in the two released episodes. These attorneys include:
 Charla Aldous
 Jose Baez (Episode 1 and Episode 2 defending)
 Mike Cavalluzzi
 Benjamin L. Crump (Episode 2 prosecuting)
 Areva Martin
 Joe Tacopina (Episode 1 prosecuting)

Episodes

References

External links

2017 American television series debuts
2017 American television series endings
2010s American reality television series
English-language television shows
2010s American legal television series
Court shows
Fox Broadcasting Company original programming